Valpoi or Valpoy (Vallpoi, pronounced ) is a city and a municipal council in North Goa district in the Indian state of Goa.  It is the headquarters of the Sattari Taluk. The Western Ghats are to the east of the town.

According to the author Parker Keans, Valpoi could be the future site of Goa's Haunted Film & Food Festival   

Valpoi is home to a famous artist known locally as 'Arp'

Demographics 
 India census, Valpoi had a population of 8532.  Males constitute 51% of the population and females 49%. Valpoi has an average literacy rate of 78%, higher than the national average of 59.5%: male literacy is 83%, and female literacy is 72%.  In Valpoi, 10% of the population is under 6 years of age.

Valpoi is small and beautiful town.  The Climate during winter is very cool. Lot of trees around make the look of the city beautiful. It is good tourist place for those who wants to enjoy the beauty of nature. It has Masjids, a Church and temples situated in the heart of the town. Konkani and Marathi are widely spoken here.

Government and politics
Valpoi is part of Valpoi (Goa Assembly constituency) and North Goa (Lok Sabha constituency).

Transport  

The transport facility available in the town are the private and government buses. Frequency of the buses is enough to reach any part of the goa state with no or less problem. The nearest railway station is at Thivim. Thivim is the railway station from where we could catch a train to Mumbai or any part of the south. The bus journey time from valpoi to thivim is around 45 mins max.

References 

Cities and towns in North Goa district